The peppered chub (Macrhybopsis tetranema), also known as the Arkansas River speckled chub, is a freshwater ray-finned fish in the family Cyprinidae, the carps and minnows. It historically occurred throughout the Arkansas River drainage, but today is found in the Ninnescah River, a small portion of the Arkansas River in Kansas and the South Canadian River between Ute and Meredith reservoirs in New Mexico and Texas. Its preferred habitat is shallow channels of large, permanently flowing, sandy streams, and prefers currents over a substrate of clean, fine sand.

On February 25, 2022, the peppered chub was added to the endangered species list.

References

Macrhybopsis
Freshwater fish of the United States
Fish described in 1886
Taxa named by Charles Henry Gilbert